Paraneotermes simpliconies is a type of termite, found in the drylands of North America, like the Death Valley. It mostly lives and feeds on rotten and fallen Joshua trees. Its main predators are birds like cactus wren.

References 

Termites
Insects described in 1920